The Brisbane Heat (WBBL) are an Australian women's Twenty20 cricket team based in Albion, Queensland. The Heat compete in the Women's Big Bash League and have won two championships, winning back-to-back titles across WBBL04 and WBBL05.

History

Formation
One of eight founding WBBL teams, the Brisbane Heat are aligned with the men's team of the same name. On 24 June 2015, Queensland Cricket confirmed Andy Richards would be the Heat's inaugural coach. At the official WBBL launch on 10 July, Holly Ferling was unveiled as the team's first-ever player signing. Delissa Kimmince was appointed as Brisbane's inaugural captain.

The Heat played their first match against the Melbourne Stars on 5 December at the Junction Oval, losing by 20 runs. They won their first match on 12 December at Aquinas College in Perth, defeating the Sydney Sixers by 35 runs.

Rivalries

Sydney Thunder 
The Heat have combined with the Sydney Thunder to produce several "thrillers", including:

 12 January 2019, Cazalys Stadium: Responding to the Thunder's first innings total of 7/171, Heat opener Beth Mooney recorded her maiden WBBL century but was then dismissed in the 17th over. With the Heat still requiring 19 runs off the last twelve balls, Harmanpreet Kaur–having already claimed two wickets, including the stumping of Mooney, for just ten runs–came on to bowl her third over. The Heat, primarily through Delissa Kimmince, scored 13 runs off the over to swing the momentum once more. Laura Harris then hit the winning runs against the bowling of Nicola Carey with three wickets in hand and three balls remaining, making it Brisbane's highest successful run chase. The result helped to set up a semi-final encounter between the two teams on the following weekend.
 19 January 2019, Drummoyne Oval: In the WBBL|04 semi-finals, the lower-ranked Heat posted a first innings total of 7/140. After struggling through the middle overs of the run chase, a late charge by the Thunder brought them back into the contest to leave a required five runs off the final delivery for victory. The last ball, sent down by spinner Jess Jonassen, was struck flat and cleanly to deep square leg by batter Nicola Carey. Jonassen immediately signalled disappointment as the ball set sail for beyond the boundary rope, therefore scoring six runs and clinching the match for the Thunder. However, Heat fielder Haidee Birkett made enough ground in time to take a "miracle" catch just inside the field of play to knock the Thunder out of the tournament. The match, in conjunction with the other semi-final played later in the day, was hailed as a showcase of "the irrefutable rise of women's cricket" and "sport with drama, skill and unpredictability – a potent recipe for success".
20 October 2019, North Sydney Oval: Thunder batters Alex Blackwell and Phoebe Litchfield set a new WBBL record for highest fourth-wicket partnership in their pursuit of the Heat's 9/150. The unbeaten 97-run stand, which got the Thunder over the line with seven balls to spare, was noted for the 20-year age gap between the two batting partners. At 16 years and 185 days, Litchfield also set a new WBBL record as the youngest player to score a half-century.

Sydney Sixers 
The Heat share a "growing rivalry" with the Sydney Sixers. However, ahead of WBBL|05, Sixers wicket-keeper Alyssa Healy claimed "(Brisbane) have made a bit more of it than we have in the last 12 to 18 months, it’s not something we're thinking of too much." Noteworthy matches include:

 26 January 2019, Drummoyne Oval: The Heat pulled off an upset victory in the WBBL|04 final to deny a Sixers three-peat, chasing down Sydney's total of 7/131 with just three wickets in hand and four balls remaining. Beth Mooney was named Player of the Final for her innings of 65 runs off 46 deliveries. Mooney, who had been receiving on-field medical treatment for the flu and heat stroke, revealed in a post-match interview that her ongoing game delays instigated sledging from several opponents: "It was kind of nice to know while I wasn't feeling well, I was going well enough to piss them off and they were getting frustrated at how long I was taking to face up... I've played enough cricket against (the Sixers) to know what gets under their skin and we definitely won that battle."
 19 October 2019, North Sydney Oval: In their first match of the 2019–20 season, the Heat posted a total of 6/165 before bowling out the Sixers for just 73. The crushing 92-run deficit was the second-largest defeat for a chasing team in WBBL history, and also the Sixers' lowest-ever score.

Melbourne Renegades
Despite winning multiple championships in the league's early years, the Heat have relatively struggled against the Melbourne Renegades. Across the competition's first five seasons, the Renegades were the only team to beat the Heat more often than not. Noteworthy matches include:
23 December 2017, Docklands Stadium: Batting first, the Heat were bowled out for 66, equalling the WBBL record for lowest all out total. The Renegades chased the target down with ten wickets in hand and 55 balls remaining, also setting a new WBBL record for largest victory by a team batting second.
27 November 2019, Allan Border Field: Targeting 184 runs to win, the Renegades set a new WBBL record for highest successful chase by sealing victory with six wickets in hand and six balls remaining.
7 December 2019, Allan Border Field: The Heat, on their way to a second consecutive title, chased down the Renegades' total of 4/163 with four wickets and twelve balls to spare in the first-ever semi-final encounter between the two teams. Wicket-keeper Josie Dooley, having won a championship with Brisbane in the previous season, top-scored for the Renegades with 50 not out.

Adelaide Strikers 
Noteworthy matches between the Heat and the Adelaide Strikers include:

 21 January 2017, The Gabba: Chasing a modest total of 6/127, the Strikers required three runs for victory with two balls remaining. Brisbane medium-pacer Deandra Dottin then bowled Tegan McPharlin before conceding two runs off the final delivery to force a tie. In the resulting super over, Dottin–who had earlier scored 51 runs with the bat–capped off a dominant all-round performance by taking two wickets and limiting Adelaide to just four runs. Beth Mooney scored the winning runs to secure the Heat's first finals appearance.
 8 December 2019, Allan Border Field: In the WBBL|05 final, the Heat gained early ascendancy through quick bowler Georgia Prestwidge, who dismissed Player of the Tournament Sophie Devine for just five. A late "superb" knock of 55 runs from 33 balls by Amanda-Jade Wellington helped the Strikers to recover to a competitive score of 7/161. The match swung heavily toward Brisbane's favour in the fifth over of the run chase when Sammy-Jo Johnson hit four sixes against the bowling of Devine, though Johnson would be out caught-and-bowled on the last ball of the over. When Devine returned to bowl the eleventh over of the innings, Heat batter Jess Jonassen was dropped by Wellington at extra cover. Jonassen then scored a boundary from each of the next three deliveries she faced, taking Brisbane's required scoring rate down to less than a run a ball. Mirroring the climax of the previous season's decider against the Sixers, Laura Harris proceeded to hit the winning runs–this time with six wickets in hand and eleven balls remaining. For her contribution of 56 not out, Beth Mooney was again named Player of the Final as the Heat claimed a second consecutive championship.

Captaincy records

There have been three captains in the Heat's history, including matches featuring an acting captain.

Source:

Season summaries

Home grounds

Players

Current squad

Australian representatives
 The following is a list of cricketers who have played for the Heat after making their debut in the national women's team (the period they spent as both a Heat squad member and an Australian-capped player is in brackets):

Overseas marquees

Associate rookies

Statistics and awards

Team stats
Champions: 2 – WBBL04, WBBL05
Runners-up: 0
Minor premiers: 1 – WBBL|05
 Win–loss record:

 Highest score in an innings: 192 (20 overs) vs Melbourne Renegades, 6 November 2021
 Highest successful chase: 7/172 (19.3 overs) vs Sydney Thunder, 12 January 2019
 Lowest successful defence: 6/127 (20 overs) vs Adelaide Strikers, 21 January 2017
 Largest victory:
 Batting first: 92 runs vs Sydney Sixers, 19 October 2019
 Batting second: 68 balls remaining vs Melbourne Stars, 10 January 2019
 Longest winning streak: 7 matches, twice (3–22 November 2019 and 11–22 November 2020)
 Longest losing streak: 3 matches

Source:

Individual stats
 Most runs: Beth Mooney – 2,576
 Highest score in an innings: Grace Harris – 103 (55) vs Sydney Sixers, 12 December 2015
 Highest partnership: Grace Harris and Georgia Redmayne – 165 vs Melbourne Renegades, 18 October 2022
 Most wickets: Jess Jonassen – 138
 Best bowling figures in an innings: Jemma Barsby – 4/2 (2 overs) vs Sydney Thunder, 28 January 2018

 Most catches (fielder): Grace Harris – 40
 Most dismissals (wicket-keeper): Beth Mooney – 67 (41 catches, 26 stumpings)

Source:

Individual awards
 Player of the Match:
 Beth Mooney – 16
 Grace Harris – 10
 Laura Harris, Jess Jonassen, Georgia Redmayne – 6 each
 Amelia Kerr – 5
 Sammy-Jo Johnson 4
 Deandra Dottin – 3
 Jemma Barsby, Haidee Birkett, Josie Dooley, Holly Ferling, Ellie Johnston, Georgia Prestwidge, Kirby Short, Courtney Sippel, Georgia Voll, Lauren Winfield – 1 each
 WBBL Player of the Tournament: Beth Mooney – WBBL02
WBBL Player of the Final: Beth Mooney (2) – WBBL04, WBBL05
 WBBL Team of the Tournament:
 Jess Jonassen (4) – WBBL02, WBBL05, WBBL07, WBBL08
Beth Mooney (4) – WBBL01, WBBL|02, WBBL03, WBBL|05
 Grace Harris (2) – WBBL04, WBBL|07
Georgia Redmayne (2) – WBBL|07, WBBL|08
 Nicola Hancock – WBBL|08
 Laura Harris – WBBL06
 Sammy-Jo Johnson – WBBL|04
 Amelia Kerr – WBBL|08
 Delissa Kimmince – WBBL|04

Sponsors

See also

Queensland Cricket
Queensland Fire

References

Notes

External links

 
Women's Big Bash League teams
Cricket in Queensland
Sporting clubs in Brisbane
Cricket clubs established in 2015
2015 establishments in Australia